FC Aragvi Dusheti, or simply Aragvi Dusheti is a Georgian association football club from Dusheti, currently competing in Liga 3. The club play their home games at Central Stadium, which is able to hold 2,000 people.

History 
Established in 1954, during the Soviet period Aragvi mainly participated in the East group of Georgian republican league 2. 

In the 2008–09 season, the team played in the Meore Liga. Shiola Shiolashvili led the team to first place in the third tier. In 2009–10 season the team had the opportunity to participate in the Pirveli Liga next year, but some financial problems made this goal unachievable. Although the city council stopped supporting Aragvi, which brought the club to the verge of collapse, the football school continued to exist and was awaiting a revival.

A few years later, the club was rebuilt but the financial problems could not be completely resolved. In an interview, Aragvi's general manager Soso Tchikaidze said that the help provided by the municipality was not enough to bring the team together.

In August 2017 it was confirmed that "Jaba Credit" had become the club's main sponsor. Since then Aragvi invited several new players. In 2017 Aragvi competed in Group B of the Regional League. The team finished second in the tournament table with 60 points. In playoffs Aragvi Dusheti defeated Skuri Tsalenjikha 2-1 and advanced to the Liga 3.

In 2018 the club made a debut in Liga 3 and was ranked sixth, guaranteeing survival in the league of twenty teams.

The next year they finished third, therefore, succeeding in qualification for play-offs against Erovnuli Liga 2 team Guria Lanchkhuti. Aragvi lost 0-1 at home, but emerged victorious over their opponents in the return leg after the overtime by a 2-1 aggregate score and advanced to the second tier.

The debut in this division in 2020, though, turned out unsuccessful. Aragvi finished bottom of the table and left the league. Their attempt to climb back there via promotion play-offs in 2022 ended in a narrow defeat.

Seasons

Notes

Squad
As of April 2022

 

(C)

Head Coach
The current manager has spent nine seasons at WIT Georgia as a player. He started coaching in 2011 at youth teams. Later he worked as a manager at WIT Georgia, Shukura Kobuleti and Gareji Sagarejo.

Honours
Regionuli Liga

 Runners-up (1): 2017 (East B)

Liga 3

 Third place (2): 2019, 2022

References

External links 
 Club's Official Facebook page

Profile on Soccerway

Football clubs in Georgia (country)